The Lithuanian A Lyga 2008 was the 19th season of top-tier football in Lithuania. The season started on 29 March 2008 and ended on 16 November 2008.

The league had to reduce the number of its teams from ten to nine prior to this season due to lacking of team able to earn promotion (see below). Shortly before the start of the season, Vilnius withdrew from participating in the league because of unknown reasons, leaving the league with 8 competing teams.

Clubs

Promotion and relegation
Interas-AE Visaginas were relegated to the Lithuanian First League after finishing the 2007 season in last place with only 8 points. Šilutė were originally scheduled to play the 2nd placed team of the First League, Rodiklis Kaunas, in a relegation play-off, but Rodiklis declined promotion due to lacking financial capabilities.

First League champions Alytis Alytus also had to forfeit their place in this year's league because their ground was not suitable for top-tier football, so no team was promoted.

League standings

Results
Every team played each other four times, twice at home and twice on the road, for a total of 28 games.

First half of season

Second half of season

Top goalscorers
Source: lfe.lt ''

References 

LFF Lyga seasons
1
Lith
Lith